Sharon Fichman and Jovana Jakšić were the defending champions, but decided not to participate this year.

Francesca Di Lorenzo and Ronit Yurovsky won the title, defeating Marie-Alexandre Leduc and Charlotte Robillard-Millette 1–6, 7–5, [10–6] in the final.

Seeds

Draw

References
Main Draw

Winnipeg National Bank Challenger
Winnipeg Challenger